The 2016 Copa Constitució is the 24th edition of the national football knockout tournament in Andorra. The tournament began on 21 February 2016 and ended on 15 May 2016 with the final.

Format
This year's version of the Copa Constitució was a single elimination tournament contested by 12 teams. Eight teams from the Primera Divisió and four from the Segona Divisió competed. The winner, UE Santa Coloma, earned a spot in the Europa League.

Schedule

First round
Eight teams competed in the first round. Matches were played 21 February 2016.

|}

Quarter-finals
Eight teams competed in the quarter-finals. Matches were played 28 February 2016.

|}

Semi-finals
Four teams competed in the quarter-finals. Matches were played 6 March 2016.

|}

Final
The final was played on 15 May 2016 at Estadi Comunal d'Andorra la Vella, Andorra la Vella.

See also
2015–16 Primera Divisió

External links
FAF
scoresway.com
UEFA
soccerway.com

References

Copa Constitució seasons
Andorra
Copa